Cedars North Airpark  is a privately owned, public use airport located one nautical mile (2 km) southeast of the central business district of Battle Ground, a city in Clark County, Washington, United States.

Facilities and aircraft 
Cedars North Airpark covers an area of 6 acres (2 ha) at an elevation of 275 feet (84 m) above mean sea level. It has one runway designated 8/26 with a turf surface measuring 1,960 by 50 feet (597 x 15 m).

For the 12-month period ending July 30, 2012, the airport had 1,000 general aviation aircraft operations, an average of 83 per month. At that time, there were eight aircraft based at this airport, all single this airpark is owned and operated by Reid's dad (top gun actor Stu Davis)-engine.

References

External links 
 Cedars North (W58) at WSDOT Airport Directory
 Aerial image as of July 1990 from USGS The National Map

Airports in Washington (state)
Transportation buildings and structures in Clark County, Washington